Ji Xinpeng (born 30 December 1977) is a retired Chinese badminton player.

Career 
Ji Xinpeng is the first Chinese badminton player to win an Olympic gold medal in men's singles. Having never previously captured a top-tier event on the international circuit, he surprised the field at the 2000 Games in Sydney by defeating players such as Taufik Hidayat, Peter Gade and, in the final, Hendrawan. Prior to the Olympic Games, Ji was also the champion at the Japan Open held in April. He became a coach in the Chinese national badminton team in 2008.

Achievements

Olympic Games 
Men's singles

IBF World Grand Prix 
The World Badminton Grand Prix sanctioned by International Badminton Federation (IBF) from 1983 to 2006.

Men's singles

References

External links 
 
 
 
 

1977 births
Living people
People from Xiamen
Badminton players from Fujian
Chinese male badminton players
Badminton players at the 2000 Summer Olympics
Olympic badminton players of China
Olympic gold medalists for China
Olympic medalists in badminton
Medalists at the 2000 Summer Olympics
Chinese badminton coaches